The 2000 Hertsmere Borough Council election took place on 4 May 2000 to elect members of Hertsmere Borough Council in Hertfordshire, England. One third of the council was up for election and the Conservative Party stayed in overall control of the council.

After the election, the composition of the council was:
Conservative 22
Labour 12
Liberal Democrat 5

Election result
Overall turnout at the election as 30.6%.

References

2000 English local elections
2000
2000s in Hertfordshire